Below are the squads for the Football at the 2017 Southeast Asian Games - women's tournament, hosted by Malaysia, which took place between 14 and 29 August 2017.

Round-robin

Manager: Mohd Asyraaf Fong Abdullah

Manager:  Reijners Roger Johannes Joseph Hubertus

Manager: Marnelli Dimzon

Manager:  Spencer Prior

Manager: Mai Duc Chung

References 

Women's team squads